is a passenger railway station on the Seibu Shinjuku Line located in the city of Kawagoe, Saitama, Japan, operated by the private railway operator Seibu Railway. This is one of three main stations of the city; the other two are Kawagoe Station and Kawagoeshi Station.

Lines
Hon-Kawagoe Station is the terminus of the 47.5 km (30 mile) Seibu Shinjuku Line from Seibu-Shinjuku Station in Tokyo.

The station is approximately 5 minutes' walk from Kawagoeshi Station on the Tōbu Tōjō Line, and 15 minutes' walk from Kawagoe Station on the JR Kawagoe Line and Tōbu Tōjō Line.

Station layout
The station has three terminating tracks situated at ground level. The main ticket barriers are located on the ground floor level, with additional ticket barriers on the second floor providing direct access to the adjoining Pepe department store.

History
The station opened as Kawagoe Station on the Kawagoe Railway on March 21, 1895. The station name was changed to the present name on July 22, 1940, following the opening of Kawagoe Station on the Kawagoe Line of Japanese Government Railways. On October 20, 2012 the station acquired the secondary name  in order to encourage more tourists to visit the area. The name is a reference to the nearby 19th-century clock tower and storehouses.

Station numbering was introduced on all Seibu Railway lines during fiscal 2012, with Hon-Kawagoe Station becoming "SS29".

A new entrance opened on the west side of the station on 20 February 2016, providing easier access for passengers transferring to and from Kawagoeshi Station on the Tobu Tojo Line. From this date, the original main entrance became the "East  Entrance".

Passenger statistics
In fiscal 2019, the station was the 18th busiest on the Seibu network with an average of 53,230 passengers daily.  The passenger figures for previous years are as shown below.

Surrounding area

Station building
 Pepe department store
 Kawagoe Prince Hotel

Stations
 Kawagoeshi Station (Tōbu Tōjō Line)
 Kawagoe Station (Tōbu Tōjō Line/JR Kawagoe Line)

Civic/culture
 Kawagoe City Office
 Kawagoe City Museum
 Kawagoe City Art Gallery
 Kita-in Temple
 Hikawa Shrine
 Renkeiji Temple

Education
 Saitama Prefectural Girls' High School
 Saitama Prefectural Kawagoe High School
 Yamamura Gakuen High School
 Hoshino Gakuen High School & Junior High School
 Kawagoe Technical High School

Other

Bus services
The following long-distance express bus services operate from the south side of the station.

 Haneda Airport, operated by Airport Transport Service (Limousine Bus) and Seibu Bus
 Tokyo Disney Resort, operated jointly by Tokyo Bay City Bus and Tobu Bus West

See also
 List of railway stations in Japan

References

External links

 Hon-Kawagoe Station information (Seibu Railway) 

Railway stations in Japan opened in 1895
Stations of Seibu Railway
Railway stations in Kawagoe, Saitama